"Julefeber" (English: "Christmas Fever") is a song by Danish singer and songwriter Oh Land. Oh Land wrote the song with Jesper Mechlenburg, composer of the DR1 television series Julefeber (2020). It was written for usage within the series and was released in Denmark as a single on 13 November 2020 through Tusk or Tooth Records, before being released internationally three days later.

Music video 
The accompanying music video for "Julefeber" was released to DR1's official YouTube channel on 25 November 2020.

Charts

Certifications

Release history

References 

2020 singles
2020 songs
Christmas songs
Oh Land songs
Songs written by Oh Land